DB Netz AG is a major subsidiary of Deutsche Bahn that owns and operates a majority of the German railway system (2019: 33,291 km). It is one of the largest railway infrastructure manager by length and transport volume of its network.

The company was established in the course of the second stage of the German rail reform as a subsidiary of Deutsche Bahn AG. DB Netz is headquartered in Frankfurt and it has seven regional divisions ("Regionalbereiche", RB) and a central division. The locations of its regional headquarters are Berlin (RB east), Frankfurt (RB central), Duisburg (RB west), Hanover (RB north), Karlsruhe (RB southwest), Leipzig (RB southeast) and Munich (RB south). DB Netz AG is profitable from route fees but receives extensive public funding for maintaining, developing and extending the network of European and federal transportation routes.

It was included in the brand DB Netze when Deutsche Bahn was reorganised into three major divisions covering passengers, logistics, and infrastructure. However its legal entity remained.

Despite being an integral part of Deutsche Bahn AG and one of its major subsidiaries, DB Netz AG has to grant non-discriminatory access to other rail service providers that are in competition to Deutsche Bahn's other major business units. Therefore DB Netz AG is overseen by the Federal Network Agency.

Deutsche Bahn
Railway companies of Germany
Railway infrastructure managers
Defunct companies of Germany